Chiropetalum is a plant genus of the family Euphorbiaceae first described as a genus in 1832. It is widespread across relatively dry regions of North and South America from Texas to Uruguay.

Species

References

Chrozophoreae
Euphorbiaceae genera